Everett Public Schools is a school district in Everett, Massachusetts, United States.

Schools
Everett High School
Albert N. Parlin School
George Keverian School
Lafayette School
Sumner G. Whittier School
Webster School

References

External links

School districts in Massachusetts
Everett, Massachusetts
Education in Middlesex County, Massachusetts